The Henan University of Economics and Law is a provincial public university located in Zhengzhou. Henan, China. 

The university was formed by a merge between Henan Finance and Economics College and Henan Political and Legal Management Cadre College in March 2010. It is accredited by the Ministry of Education of China.

As of August 2016, the university has 3 campuses: the North, South, and Zheng Dong, which together cover an area of more than 2,000 acres. The school has various teaching laboratories, a library collection of c. 2,600,000 volumes, a stadium, and other basic facilities. A total of 24 yuan (departments) offer 59 undergraduate degrees.

The school hosts more than 28,000 full-time students. Staff totals more than 1,900, including over 1,500 full-time teachers, more than 700 of whom have senior professional titles. A total of 370 professors have doctoral degrees, and 843 more have master's degrees.

References

Universities and colleges in Henan
Business schools in China
Educational institutions established in 1983
Universities and colleges in Zhengzhou
1983 establishments in China